The Ministry of Education of Iran (Vezârat-e Âmôzesh vâ Parvâresh-e Jomhuri-ye Eslâmi-ye Iran) (lit. Ministry of Teaching and Growing of the Islamic Republic of Iran) established in 1964, is an Iranian government body (department) responsible for the oversight of K-12 education in Iran. Each year, a certain portion of the yearly budget gets allocated to public educational institutions (government-run schools & universities). Currently, the average of 20% of government spending and 5% of GDP is allocated to the education sector, a rate that is subjectively higher than most other countries that are in the similar age bracket of Iran (around the age of 50 years). The amount that is allocated to the educational institutions, 50% of it is given to secondary education institutions and 21% of the annual state education budget is allocated to the post-secondary educational institutions (tertiary educational institutions).
Also Shahid Rajaee Teacher Training University and Farhangian University are the university of teacher education and human resource development in the Ministry of Education.

See also
Education in Iran
Student Organization of Iran 
Farhangian University
Ali Asghar Fani
Adib Astronomy Teaching Centre
Mohammad Bathaei
 Yousef Nouri

References

External links
 Webpage of the Ministry of Education

1964 establishments in Iran
Education
Iran
Iran, Education